Charing Cross Road is a 1935 British musical romance film directed by Albert de Courville and starring John Mills, June Clyde, Derek Oldham and Belle Baker. The film takes its title from the Charing Cross Road that runs through Central London, and its plot concerns the denizens of theatrical boarding houses living there.

Cast 
 John Mills – Tony
 June Clyde – Pam
 Derek Oldham – Jimmy O'Connell
 Belle Baker – Belle
 Jean Colin – Cherry
 Arthur Sinclair – Mac
 Garry Marsh – Berry
 C. Denier Warren – Salesman
 Coral Browne – Lady Ruston
 Charles Heslop – Langdon
 Alfred Wellesley – Producer
 Judy Kelly – Vera

References

External links 
 

1935 films
1935 drama films
Films directed by Albert de Courville
British drama films
British black-and-white films
1930s English-language films
1930s British films